Raymond Jack Lininger (June 27, 1927 – August 30, 2002) was an American football linebacker who played two seasons with the Detroit Lions of the National Football League. He was drafted by the Detroit Lions in the 21st round of the 1949 NFL Draft. He played college football at Ohio State University and attended Van Wert High School in Van Wert, Ohio.

References

External links
Just Sports Stats

1927 births
2002 deaths
Players of American football from Ohio
American football linebackers
Ohio State Buckeyes football players
Detroit Lions players
People from Van Wert, Ohio